Tagliolo Monferrato is a comune (municipality) in the Province of Alessandria in the Italian region Piedmont, located about  southeast of Turin and about  south of Alessandria.

The municipality of Tagliolo Monferrato contains the frazioni (subdivisions, mainly villages and hamlets) Cherli, Grossi, Varo, Pessino, Caraffa, Gambina and Mongiardino.

Tagliolo Monferrato borders the following municipalities: Belforte Monferrato, Bosio, Casaleggio Boiro, Lerma, Ovada, Rossiglione, and Silvano d'Orba.

Demographic evolution

See also 
 Parco naturale delle Capanne di Marcarolo

References

Cities and towns in Piedmont